Crause was a weapons manufacturer located in Herzberg, Germany, operating in the first half of the 19th century. Among other orders, they manufactured 2,000 M1849 kammerladers for the Norwegian Army.

Manufacturing companies of Germany